Yusuf Behçet Gücer (1890 – 12 February 1952) was a Turkish politician, and a member of the CHP. He furthermore served as a teacher and principal of Galatasaray High School.

References 

1890 births
1952 deaths
Place of death missing
Schoolteachers from Istanbul
Republican People's Party (Turkey) politicians
20th-century Turkish politicians
Galatasaray High School alumni
Politicians from Istanbul